Jonas M. Kilmer House, also known as the Kilmer Mansion, is a historic home located at Binghamton in Broome County, New York. It was constructed in 1898 and is a large -story residence using an eclectic Victorian-era vocabulary.  It is primarily constructed of stone and features irregular form and massing.  The building is characterized by a variety of different sized gables and turrets, all surmounted by a high hipped roof clad in asbestos shingles.  Jonas M. Kilmer (1843–1912) was the father of Willis Sharpe Kilmer (1869–1940).

It was listed on the National Register of Historic Places in 2006.

References

External links

Temple Concord, Binghamton, NY - Home

Houses in Binghamton, New York
Houses on the National Register of Historic Places in New York (state)
Houses completed in 1893
National Register of Historic Places in Broome County, New York